EAI may refer to:

 East Asia Institute
East Asia Institute (Korea)
East Asia Institute (Ludwigshafen)
Weatherhead East Asian Institute
 Electro-Acoustic improvisation
 Electronic Arts Intermix, an American art organization
 Electronic Associates, Inc., an American analog computer manufacturer
 Element AI, a Canadian artificial intelligence company
 Email address internationalization
 Engineering Animation, Inc., a defunct American visualization software company
 Enterprise application integration, the use of software and computer systems' architectural principles to integrate a set of enterprise computer applications
 Erythema ab igne
 European Alliance for Innovation, a professional association
 Excalibur Almaz, a Manx private spaceflight company

See also
 AEI (disambiguation)